Kharabeh Amin (also Romanized as Kharābeh Amīn and Kharābeh-ye Amīn) is a village in Miyan Velayat Rural District, in the Central District of Mashhad County, Razavi Khorasan Province, Iran. At the 2006 census, its population was 1,023, in 252 families.

References 

Populated places in Mashhad County